Schefflera nervosa is a species of plant in the family Araliaceae. It is endemic to Peninsular Malaysia. It is threatened by habitat loss.

References

nervosa
Endemic flora of Peninsular Malaysia
Vulnerable plants
Taxonomy articles created by Polbot